Similonedine brunniofasciata is a species of beetle in the family Cerambycidae, and the only species in the genus Similonedine. It was described by Hua in 1993 and is endemic to China (Fujian and Hunan).

References

Desmiphorini
Beetles described in 1992
Endemic fauna of China
Monotypic beetle genera